Vouprasia is a former municipality in Elis, West Greece, Greece. Since the 2011 local government reform it is part of the municipality Andravida-Kyllini, of which it is a municipal unit. Its seat of administration was Varda, a small town with a population of about 2,300. The municipal unit has about 8,400 inhabitants. The area of the municipal unit is 170.859 km².

Geography

Vouprasia is located in northern Elis, on the Ionian coast between Patras and Pyrgos. The Greek National Road 9/E55 and the Patras-Kalamata railway line pass through it. Vouprasia has one disused railway station, in Varda.

The area is mostly flat, and the main land use is agriculture. The lagoon Kotychi, connected with the Ionian Sea, is located in the western part of Vouprasia. There is a health center in Varda.

Vouprasia borders on (clockwise from the west) the Ionian Sea, the municipal units Larissos and Olenia (both Achaea) and the municipal units Pineia, Amaliada and Lechaina (both Elis).

Subdivisions
The municipal unit Vouprasia is subdivided into the following communities:

Population history

References

External links

 
Populated places in Elis